Fanny Foley Herself is a 1931 American pre-Code comedy-drama film shot entirely in Technicolor. The film was the second feature to be filmed using a new Technicolor process, which removed grain and resulted in improved color. It was released under the title Top of the Bill in Britain.

Plot
Edna May Oliver plays a widowed woman with two daughters (Helen Chandler, Rochelle Hudson) who attempts to revive her career as a vaudeville performer. Her wealthy father-in-law, who believes that a vaudeville performer is not fit to bring up children properly, forces her to choose between her daughters or her career. In the end, all is forgiven and the father-in-law asks Fanny to sing one of her songs.

Cast
 Edna May Oliver as Fanny Foley
 Hobart Bosworth as Seely
 Florence Roberts as Lucy
 Rochelle Hudson as Carmen
 Helen Chandler as Lenore
 John Darrow as Teddy
 Robert Emmett O'Connor as Burns
 Harry Stubbs as Crosby

(cast list as per AFI database)

Production background
As a result of the quality of the color work in The Runaround (1931), Radio Pictures decided to produce three more pictures in the improved Technicolor process. Only Fanny Foley Herself was completed and released in Technicolor. The titles of the two other features were Marcheta and Bird of Paradise. Marcheta seems to have been abandoned, while Bird of Paradise was changed into a black-and-white production starring Dolores del Río and Joel McCrea.
This was Edna May Oliver's first appearance in color. She appeared in color only once more, in the 1939 film Drums Along the Mohawk. She did not appear in the Technicolor sequences of The American Venus (1926).
This was Helen Chandler's only appearance in a color film. She did not appear in the color sequences of Radio Parade of 1935 (1934). She may have appeared in the color sequences of the silent film The Joy Girl (1927). This film, rumored to exist at the Museum of Modern Art, is unavailable for inspection.

Reception
In October 1931, The New York Times said, "There are greenish skies, steel-tinted nights, amber lights, frocks and gowns of pastel shades, most of this prismatic work being quite well done. But whether it is, on the whole, more effective than black and white is a matter of opinion."

Preservation status
A complete copy of the film (with the British title) survives in the BFI archive. A trailer of 200 ft also survives.

See also
List of lost films
List of early color feature films

References

External links

1931 films
1930s color films
1931 lost films
American comedy-drama films
Films about entertainers
Lost American films
RKO Pictures films
Films about theatre
1931 comedy-drama films
Films directed by Melville W. Brown
Early color films
1930s English-language films
1930s American films